Ben & Liam was an Australian breakfast radio show on Nova 919 in Adelaide, South Australia. It was hosted by comedians Ben Harvey and Liam Stapleton.

The show airs from 6am to 9am on weekdays with music and daily topic discussions and special guests. A daily podcast featuring the best bits from each show is available on ITunes

History
The show commenced broadcasting on 6 January 2020, In January 2023, the show will move to Nova 100 in Melbourne with producer Belle Jackson joining them and the show will be titled Ben, Liam & Belle.

References

Australian radio personalities
Australian comedy radio programs
Australian comedy troupes
Australian comedy duos
2010s Australian radio programs
2020s Australian radio programs
Nova Entertainment
Triple J programs